Arabi (also Romanized as ‘Arabī) is a village in Markazi Rural District, in the Central District of Dashti County, Bushehr Province, Iran. At the 2006 census, its population was 1,096, in 253 families.

References 

Populated places in Dashti County